The silicon-vacancy center (Si-V) is an optically active defect in diamond (referred to as a color center) that is receiving an increasing amount of interest in the diamond research community. This interest is driven primarily by the coherent optical properties of the Si-V, especially compared to the well-known and extensively-studied nitrogen-vacancy center (N-V).

Properties

Crystallographic 

The Si-V center is formed by replacing two neighboring carbon atoms in the diamond lattice with one silicon atom, which places itself between the two vacant lattice sites. This configuration has a D3d point group symmetry.

Electronic 

The Si-V center is a single-hole (spin-1/2) system with ground and excited electronic states located within the diamond bandgap. The ground and excited electronic states have two orbital states split by spin–orbit coupling. Each of these spin–orbit states is doubly degenerate by spin, and this splitting can be affected by lattice strain. Phonons in the diamond lattice drive transitions between these orbital states, causing rapid equilibration of the orbital population at temperatures above ca. 1 K.

All four transitions between the two ground and two excited orbital states are dipole allowed with a sharp zero-phonon line (ZPL) at 738 nm (1.68 eV) and minimal phononic sideband in a roughly 20 nm window around 766 nm. The Si-V center emits much more of its emission into its ZPL, approximately 70% (Debye–Waller factor of 0.7), than most other optical centers in diamond, such as the nitrogen-vacancy center (Debye–Waller factor ~ 0.04). The Si-V center also has higher excited states that relax quickly to the lowest excited states, allowing off-resonant excitation.

The Si-V center has an inversion symmetry, and no static electric dipole moment (to the first order); it is therefore insensitive to the Stark shift that could result from inhomogeneous electric fields within the diamond lattice. This property, together with the weak electron-phonon coupling, results in a narrow ZPL in the Si-V center, which is mostly limited by its intrinsic lifetime. Bright photoluminescence, narrow optical lines, and ease of finding optically indistinguishable Si-V centers favor them for applications in solid-state quantum optics.

Spin 

Although the optical transitions of the Si-V center preserve the electron spin, the rapid phonon-induced mixing between the Si-V orbital states causes spin decoherence. Yet it is possible to use the 29Si nuclear spin of the Si-V as a qubit for quantum information applications.

References 

Diamond
Spintronics
Spectroscopy
Crystallographic defects
Quantum information science